Kitt O'Brien (born April 29, 1990) is a former American football offensive guard. He attended Ball State University, and signed with the Cleveland Gladiators of the Arena Football League (AFL) as an undrafted free agent in 2013.

College career
O'Brien played college football for the Ball State Cardinals, appearing in 40 games and starting 36. He was an integral piece of the offensive line in 2011, as the Ball State offensive line allowed only 11 sacks all season, 12th lowest in the NCAA.

Professional career

Cleveland Gladiators
O'Brien was not drafted in 2013. He was invited to attend training camp with the New York Giants, but did not sign. He then signed with the Cleveland Gladiators of the Arena Football League (AFL). O'Brien played in 5 games with the Gladiators in 2013, 18 games in 2014 and 16 games in 2015.

Indianapolis Colts
On August 7, 2015, O'Brien signed with the Indianapolis Colts of the National Football League (NFL), after Ben Heenan was waived. O'Brien was waived by the Colts the following day, and re-signed with the Colts on August 10. He was released on September 5, at the end of the preseason. On October 31, O'Brien signed to the Colts practice squad. He was released on November 10. O'Brien was again signed to the practice squad on December 29.

On September 3, 2016, he was waived by the Colts as part of final roster cuts. He was signed to the Colts' practice squad on December 15, 2016.

Cleveland Browns
O'Brien signed with the Cleveland Browns on July 30, 2017. He was waived on September 1, 2017, during roster cutdowns.

Birmingham Iron
In November 2018, O'Brien signed with the Birmingham Iron of the Alliance of American Football.

Carolina Panthers
On April 5, 2019, O'Brien signed with the Carolina Panthers of the NFL. He was placed on injured reserve on August 30, 2019.

References

External links

 Profile at ClevelandGladiators.com
 Profile at Colts.com

1990 births
Living people
American football offensive guards
Ball State Cardinals football players
Carolina Panthers players
Cleveland Browns players
Cleveland Gladiators players
Indianapolis Colts players
People from Cass County, Indiana
Players of American football from Indiana
Birmingham Iron players